David Yarburgh Cunliffe-Lister, 2nd Earl of Swinton, JP, DL (21 March 1937 – 26 March 2006) was a British peer and politician.

Background
David Cunliffe-Lister was the son of the Hon John Yarburgh Cunliffe-Lister and his wife Anne Irvine Medlicott.  His father died in 1943 of wounds received action in during World War II.  David was educated at Winchester College and the Royal Agricultural College, Cirencester.

His grandfather, Philip Cunliffe-Lister, created Viscount Swinton in 1935 and Earl of Swinton in 1955, had been an MP and a veteran of 11 Conservative cabinets. His great-grandfather was Samuel Lister, the founder of Lister's Mill in Bradford. Before the nationalisation of the coal industry, the family had owned the colliery in Featherstone and David never forgot his links with the area, being a fervent supporter, as well as president of, Featherstone Rovers Rugby League Club.

Cunliffe-Lister succeeded as the 2nd Earl of Swinton on the death of his grandfather in 1972 and served as Deputy Chief Whip in the House of Lords under Margaret Thatcher from 1982 to 1986.  He was also government spokesman on agriculture and education from 1983 to 1986.  He left the House of Lords following the House of Lords Act 1999.

Personal life
In 1959, he married Susan Lilian Primrose Sinclair who was created a life peer as Baroness Masham of Ilton in 1970.  He and his wife were one of the few couples who both held noble titles in their own right. They adopted two children, Claire and Jessie.

Later life
Lord Swinton was a member of the North Riding of Yorkshire County Council 1961–1974, and of its successor, North Yorkshire County Council, 1973–1977.  He was also a magistrate and Deputy Lieutenant of North Yorkshire. He was also formerly a member of the Countryside Commission and a director of the Leeds Permanent Building Society.

Death
Dogged by illness for the last 10 years of his life, Swinton suffered a stroke and was disabled by its effects and those of Parkinson's disease. He also suffered from diabetes and eventually cancer. He died 5 days after his 69th birthday.  His funeral took place at St Mary's Church, Masham on 6 April 2006. He was succeeded in the earldom and viscountcy by his younger brother Nicholas Cunliffe-Lister, 3rd Earl of Swinton.

References
2nd Earl of Swinton, DL (1937-2006) – Google Peerage News Group

External links

1937 births
2006 deaths
Members of North Yorkshire County Council
Deputy Lieutenants of the North Riding of Yorkshire
Conservative Party (UK) Baronesses- and Lords-in-Waiting
People educated at Winchester College
Alumni of the Royal Agricultural University
Deaths from diabetes
Deaths from cancer in England
Spouses of life peers
English justices of the peace
Conservative Party (UK) hereditary peers
2
Members of North Riding County Council
Swinton